García Sánchez II (Basque: Gartzea II.a Santxez; died c. 1000), was King of Pamplona and Count of Aragon from 994 until his death c. 1000. He was the eldest son of Sancho II of Pamplona and Urraca Fernández and the second Pamplonese monarch to also hold the title of count of Aragon. Modern historians refer to him as the Tremulous, though this appellation likely originally applied to his grandfather, García Sánchez I of Pamplona.

Biography 
Throughout his reign, his foreign policy seems to have been closely linked to that of Castile. His mother was an aunt of count Sancho García of Castile, and also of the powerful count of Saldaña, García Gómez of Carrión, and she appears to have played a role in forming a bridge between the kingdom and county.

He joined his cousin Sancho in attempting to break from the submission his father had offered to Córdoba, as a result of which he had to face Almanzor. In 996 he was forced to seek peace in Córdoba.  In 997 during an expedition into the land of Calatayud, García killed the governor's brother. Almanzor took revenge by beheading 50 Christians. At the Battle of Cervera in July 1000, he joined, along with count García Gómez of Saldaña, in a coalition headed by count Sancho García of Castile that was defeated by Almanzor (that count Sancho led the group is thought to reflect García's decline). Tradition names him one of the Christian leaders at the 1002 Battle of Calatañazor, which resulted in the death of Almanzor and the consequent crisis in the Caliphate of Córdoba, but there is no contemporary record of him after 1000, while his cousin Sancho Ramírez of Viguera may have been ruling in Pamplona in 1002. García was certainly dead by 1004, when his son Sancho Garcés III first appears as king.

Domestically, he granted the rule in Aragon to his brother Gonzalo, under the tutelage of his mother Urraca.  A tradition reports that he freed all of the Muslim captives being held in the kingdom.

Marriage and children 
García Sánchez II was married to Jimena Fernández, daughter of Fernando Bermúdez, Count of Cea and a distinguished member of the highest ranks of the nobility of the Kingdom of León. They had the following children:

 Sancho Garcés III, King of Navarre and Count of Aragon from 1004 until his death in 1035.
 Elvira Garcés, nun in the Monastery of Leyre.
 García Garcés
 Urraca Garcés, Queen consort of León by her marriage to Alfonso V of León from 1023 until her death in 1031.

Ancestry

Notes

Sources

10th-century births
1004 deaths
10th-century Navarrese monarchs
11th-century Navarrese monarchs
House of Jiménez
Counts of Aragon
Burials at the Monastery of San Juan de la Peña